Lardroom is an EP by the American noise rock band Barkmarket, released on August 8, 1994 by American Recordings.

Track listing

Personnel 
Adapted from the Lardroom liner notes.
Barkmarket
John Nowlin – bass guitar
Dave Sardy – lead vocals, guitar, production
Rock Savage – drums

Release history

References

External links 
 

1994 EPs
American Recordings (record label) EPs
Barkmarket albums
Albums produced by Dave Sardy